Nowarra is a German surname. Notable people with the surname include:

 Heinz Nowarra (1897–1945), German chess player
 Waltraud Nowarra (1940–2007), German chess player

See also
 Nowara

German-language surnames